Varun Thockchom  (born 9 January 1998) is an Indian professional footballer who last played as a midfielder for I-League club NEROCA FC.

Career
Born in Manipur, Thokchom was a part of ATK B which played in I-League 2nd Division. During 2019–20 I-League season, Thockchom joined Neroca FC. On 6 December 2019, Varun made his professional debut for Neroca FC against Aizwal FC. He came on as a 53rd minute substitute for Ngangom Ronald as Neroca FC won the match for 1–0. On 29 January 2020, Thokchom scored his first goal in I-League as well as for Neroca FC in the 4th minute against Punjab FC.

Career statistics

References

1998 births
Living people
People from Manipur
Indian footballers
Footballers from Manipur
Association football midfielders
I-League players
NEROCA FC players
I-League 2nd Division players